Jakobs is a German language patronymic surname from the personal name Jakob. Notable people with the name include:
 Cornelia Jakobs (1992), Swedish singer and songwriter
 Ditmar Jakobs (1953), German former footballer
 Gert Jakobs (1964), Dutch former racing cyclist
 Günther Jakobs (1937), German jurist
 Ismail Jakobs (1999), German professional footballer
 Jens Jakobs (1985), Swedish ice hockey player
 Johannes Jakobs (1917–1944), German footballer
 Josef Jakobs (1898–1941), German spy
 Julian Jakobs (1990), German footballer
 Karl Jakobs, German physicist
 Marco Jakobs (1974), German bobsledder
 Michael Jakobs (1959), retired German football player
 Wilhelm Jakobs (1858–1942), German railway engineer and construction advisor

References 

German-language surnames
Surnames from given names
Patronymic surnames